Achmore or Acha Mòr may refer to three places in Scotland in the United Kingdom:
 Achmore, Highland, a hamlet near Loch Carron
 Achmore, Lewis, a village on the Isle of Lewis; Acha Mòr on some maps
 Achmore, Ullapool, a hamlet on the Scoraig peninsula near Ullapool

See also
 Achiemore (disambiguation)